Corciano is a comune (municipality) in the Province of Perugia in the Italian region Umbria, located about 8 km west of Perugia. As of 31 December 2004, it had a population of 17,008 and an area of 63.7 km². Corciano borders the comuni of Magione and Perugia.

History
The earliest traces of human presence (some fragments of flint tools on blades and fragments of vases turned into dough) date back to Neolithic times. The discovery of two cinerari vessels (preserved in the Museum of the Palazzo Municipale) indicate the presence of humans in the period between the ninth and eighth centuries BC Between the third and first centuries BC formed several settlements (usually small) dedicated mainly to agricultural and artisanal.

The immediate neighborhood was populated by Etruscans, whose presence was dramatically signaled by the discovery in 1812 of bronze panels from a parade chariot, at Castel San Mariano di Corciano. Under Roman rule it became a district of Roman agricultural villas.

A mythical founder Coragino, companion of Ulysses, is a medieval invention recounted in the fourteenth-century Conto di Corciano e di Perugia. With the unsettled conditions of Late Antiquity, the inhabitants withdrew to the defensible hilltop site that controlled the valley that communicated between Lake Trasimeno and the upper Tiber valley. Its curving concentric street system is testimony to the three encircling walls that protected the community. Like virtually all early walled villages, the Corcianesi were under the control of the bishop, in this case the bishop of Perugia, whose rights to the castrum de Corciano were confirmed by Pope Innocent II in 1136; Corciano appears in a list of castelli belonging to Perugia, 1258. A visit by Francis of Assisi is commemorated, after his canonisation, in a church dedicated to him, which retains traces of its fourteenth and fifteenth-century frescoes. The tower of the comune, built in the thirteenth century, rises from the highest point. The triple walls and strategic site of Corciano made it a desirable stronghold in the constant warfare of the fourteenth and fifteenth centuries: in 1364 the little town was sacked by the Compania Bianca in the service of Cardinal Albornoz; in 1416 the condottiero Braccio Fortebraccio of Montone laid siege to Corciano, which resisted successfully but capitulated to him when he returned for a second attempt.

As Perugia extended its control, the seat of power shifted to the Palazzo of the Capitano del Popolo, representative of Perugia. The present Palazzo Municipale is the former seat of the signori of Corciano, the dukes of the noble family of Perugia, the Della Corgna, who constructed it in the sixteenth century as their rule over the formerly free commune was consolidated. Corciano remained part of the Papal States until the plebiscite of 1860 joined it to the Kingdom of Italy.

Demographic evolution

Corcianesi of Note
 Sara Bellachioma (Corciano, 1982), famous Italian Psychologist.
 Nicola Danzetta (Corciano, 1820 – Perugia, 1895), patriot and politician.
 Luigi Rotelli (Corciano, 1833 – Roma, 1891), cardinal of the Catholic Church.
 Artemio Giovagnoni (Perugia, 1922 – Corciano, 2007), sculptor, medallion maker, playwright, writer and poet.
 Franco Venanti (Perugia, 1930), painter, founder, together with his brother Luciano of the "Agosto corcianese" Festival.
 Carlo Brugnami (Corciano, 1938), cyclist.
 Erminia Emprin (Torino, 1952), politician. Resident in this comune.
 Antonio Ferrari, known as Dj Ralf (Bastia Umbra, 1957), disc jockey, principally House music. Resident in this comune.
 Filippo Protani (Perugia, 1969), violin maker. Resident in this comune.

References

Further reading
Fabrizio Fabbri, ed. 1999. Corciano: Arte, storia, fede di un antico Castello (Perugia)

External links

 www.comune.corciano.pg.it/